College Street Historic District in Newberry, South Carolina, United States, is an area that was built in 1880.  It was listed on the National Register of Historic Places in 1980.

References

Newberry, South Carolina
Historic districts on the National Register of Historic Places in South Carolina
Italianate architecture in South Carolina
Historic districts in Newberry County, South Carolina
National Register of Historic Places in Newberry County, South Carolina